Lieutenant-General Sir William Kidston Elles  (5 May 1837 – 5 August 1896) was a British Army officer.

Early life and education
William Kidston Elles was the son of Malcolm J. Elles. He was educated at Sandhurst.

Military career
Elles was commissioned as an ensign in the 38th Regiment of Foot in June 1854. He served with the Regiment at the siege of Sebastopol in 1855 during the Crimean War and then during the Indian Mutiny in 1857. He also served in the Hazara campaign of 1868 and then became Deputy Assistant Quarter Master General with the Intelligence Branch in 1877, Assistant Adjutant General at Horse Guards in 1881 and a brigade commander with the Madras Army in 1885. After taking part in the Third Anglo-Burmese War in 1885, he became Adjutant-General, India in 1889 and then commanded the Hazara Expedition in 1891. He also served as A.D.C. to Queen Victoria from 1881-90. He went on to be Commander-in-Chief Bengal Command in April 1895 before dying in office from cholera in August 1896.

There is a memorial to him at Christ Church in Shimla.

References

|-
 

1837 births
1896 deaths
British Army lieutenant generals
Knights Commander of the Order of the Bath
Bengal Presidency
19th-century British Army personnel
British Army personnel of the Crimean War
British military personnel of the Indian Rebellion of 1857
British military personnel of the Third Anglo-Burmese War
British military personnel of the Hazara Expedition of 1888
Deaths from cholera